Dichomeris ingloria is a moth in the family Gelechiidae. It was described by Edward Meyrick in 1923. It is found in Peru.

The forewings are ochreous grey whitish suffusedly irrorated (sprinkled) with grey or fuscous. The stigmata are dark fuscous, the plical rather obliquely before the first discal. The hindwings are light grey.

References

Moths described in 1923
ingloria